Pablo Antonio Cuadra (November 4, 1912 – January 2, 2002) was a Nicaraguan essayist, art and literary critic, playwright, graphic artist and one of the most famous poets of Nicaragua.

Early life and career
Cuadra was born on November 4, 1912 in Managua but spent the majority of his life in Granada, even studying high school at Colegio Centro America.  Cuadra or PAC was the son of Carlos Cuadra Pasos and Merceditas Cardenal. Cuadra is a first cousin of the writer Ernesto Cardenal.

Marriage and family
Cuadra married Adilia Mercedes Bendaña Ramírez.

Vanguardia movement
In 1931 Cuadra, along with José Coronel Urtecho, Joaquín Pasos, and other writers, founded the Vanguardia literary movement in Granada.

Later career
Cuadra's Poemas nicaragüenses was published in 1934. He opposed the American intervention against Augusto César Sandino in the 1930s and broke with the Somoza dynasty in the 1940s.

In 1954 he became co-director of La Prensa newspaper alongside his cousin and partner, Pedro Joaquín Chamorro Cardenal.  Chamorro was assassinated by Somoza supporters in 1978. Cuadra was briefly jailed in 1956 for his opposition to the Somoza's régime. In 1961 he became editor of the influential journal El Pez y La Serpiente (The Fish and the Serpent), which was highly influential in Latin America.

Cuadra became an outspoken advocate for Nicaragua's poor, embracing liberation theology and other intellectual currents which the Somoza government considered subversive. He later criticized the post-1979 Sandinista National Liberation Front régime for stifling the independence of Nicaragua's culture. For several years thereafter, he lived in self-imposed exile in Costa Rica and Texas.

In 1995 Cuadra was Honored with an honorary doctorate degree  by Universidad Francisco Marroquín.

Death
He died on January 2, 2002, in Managua, following a respiratory illness. Cuadra was buried on January 4 in Granada, where he spent the majority of his life.

Awards
Cuadra won many literary honors, among them the Gabriela Mistral Inter-American Cultural Prize, awarded by the Organization of American States in 1991.

Published works

Poetry
Poemas nicaragüenses (1934)
Canto temporal (1943)
Poemas con un crepúsculo a cuestas (1949)
La tierra prometida (1952)
El jaguar y la luna (1959)
Poesía (1964)
Cantos de Cifar (1971)
Esos rostros que asoman en la multitud (1976)
Siete árboles contra el atardecer (1980)

Stories
Agosto (1970, 1972)
Vuelva, Güegüense (1970)
Cuentos escogidos (1999)

Essays
Hacia la cruz del sur (1936)
Promisión de México y otros ensayos (1945)
Entre la cruz y la espada (1946)
Torres de Dios (1958, 1985)
El nicaragüense (1967)
Otro rapto de Europa (1976)
Aventura literaria del mestizaje (1987)

Theater
La Cegua (1950)
Por los caminos van los campesinos (1957)
El coro y la máscara (1991)

External links 
Honorary Doctoral Degrees, Universidad Francisco Marroquín
 Comprehensive Bibliography
 Poem set to music

References

1912 births
2002 deaths
People from Managua
Nicaraguan people of Spanish descent
Nicaraguan artists
Nicaraguan essayists
Male essayists
Nicaraguan literary critics
Nicaraguan male poets
20th-century Nicaraguan poets
20th-century essayists
20th-century male writers
People educated at Colegio Centro América